Bassus is a genus of insects belonging to the family Braconidae.

The genus has almost cosmopolitan distribution.

Species:
 Bassus abdominalis Muesebeck, 1927
 Bassus aciculatus (Ashmead, 1889)

References

Braconidae
Braconidae genera